Lost Creek Township is one of twelve townships in Vigo County, Indiana, United States. As of the 2010 census, its population was 10,497 and it contained 4,236 housing units.  It contains Terre Haute, Indiana's eastern, suburban end, along with the affluent Hulman family ranch and the Terre Haute International Airport originally named after the family. Seelyville, the third largest city in the county, is also located there.

History
Vigo County Home for Dependent Children was listed on the National Register of Historic Places in 2000.

Geography

Cities, towns, villages
 Seelyville
 Terre Haute (east side)

Unincorporated communities
 Cherryvale
 East Glenn
 Glenn Ayr
 Gospel Grove
 Grange Corner
 Swalls
 Tabertown

Adjacent townships
 Nevins Township (northeast)
 Posey Township, Clay County (east)
 Perry Township, Clay County (southeast)
 Riley Township (south)
 Honey Creek Township (southwest)
 Harrison Township (west)
 Otter Creek Township (northwest)

Cemeteries
The township contains at least these sixteen named cemeteries: Baker-Coltrin, Babtist-Moses, Calvary, Chamberlain, Cheek, Dickerson, Highland Lawn, Hobmeyer-Trueblood-Ladd-Habermeyer, Hoskins, Hyde, Mewhinney, Patterson, Roberts, Swalls, Turner-Shcolfield, and Wood. As well as at least four unnamed family plots.

Airports and landing strips
 Hulman Field

Lakes
 Hulmans Lake

Demographics 
As of the census of 2000, there were 9,907 people and 3,968 households residing in the township. The population density was 281/mi2. The racial makeup of the township was 95.5% White, 1.7% Black or African American, 0.1% Native American, 1.6% Asian, less than 0.1% Pacific Islander, 0.5% from other races, and 0.8% from two or more races. 1.0% of the population were Hispanic or Latino of any race.

The average household size was 2.44 and the average family size was 2.94.
The median age was 34.4 years. For every 100 females, there were 113 males.

The median income for a household in the township was $50,298, and the median income for a family was $66,000. The per capita income for the township was $25,181. 5.7% of the population and 2.7% of families were below the poverty line.

School districts
 Vigo County School Corporation

Political districts
 Indiana's 8th congressional district
 State House District 43
 State Senate District 38

Notable people
Al Barker, baseball player

References
 United States Census Bureau 2007 TIGER/Line Shapefiles
 United States Board on Geographic Names (GNIS)
 IndianaMap

External links

Townships in Vigo County, Indiana
Terre Haute metropolitan area
Townships in Indiana